La vuelta al nido is a 1938 Argentine psychological drama film written and directed by Leopoldo Torres Ríos and starring José Gola and Amelia Bence.

Writing for Página/12 on the occasion of its screening at the Mar del Plata International Film Festival in 2019, Diego Brodersen described it as a masterpiece and felt that: "Seen today, it stands out for its naturalism and narrative modernity, influenced by the cinema of directors such as King Vidor."

It was selected as the fifth greatest Argentine film of all time in a poll conducted by the Museo del Cine Pablo Ducrós Hicken in 1977, while it ranked 24th in the 2000 edition. In a new version of the survey organized in 2022 by the specialized magazines La vida util, Taipei and La tierra quema, presented at the Mar del Plata International Film Festival, the film reached the 51 position.

References

External links
 
 La vuelta al nido at Cinenacional.com (in Spanish)
 

1938 films
1930s Spanish-language films
1930s psychological drama films
Argentine black-and-white films
Films directed by Leopoldo Torres Ríos
Argentine drama films
1938 drama films
1930s Argentine films